SS Charles C. Randleman was a Liberty ship built in the United States during World War II.

Construction
Charles C. Randleman was laid down on 15 January 1945, under a Maritime Commission (MARCOM) contract, MC hull 2402, by J.A. Jones Construction, Brunswick, Georgia; she was sponsored by Mrs. Harry R. Baggett, sister of the namesake, and launched on 25 February 1945.

History
She was allocated to the American Foreign Steamship Corporation, on 13 March 1945. On 31 August 1945, she was grounded on Apo Reef, off Mindoro Island, and declared a constructive total loss (CTL).

References

Bibliography

 
 
 
 
 

 

Liberty ships
Ships built in Brunswick, Georgia
1945 ships
Maritime incidents in August 1945